The flag of Łódź features the two heraldic tinctures of the coat of arms of Łódź: or over gules. In the centre the coat of arms itself appears, depicting a boat, since łódź in Polish means "boat".

External links

Łódź
Flag
Flags introduced in 1936